Yassine Rachik (born 11 June 1993) is a Moroccan-born Italian long-distance runner who won the Italian Athletics Championships three times and also won an individual bronze medal at the 2018 European Athletics Championships.

Biographhy
He competed at the 2020 Summer Olympics, in Marathon. Rachik became an Italian citizen in 2015. During his career he also won the gold medal with the Italy national athletics team in the 2018 European Athletics Championships – Men's Marathon Cup, and also at U-23 level at the 2015 European Athletics U23 Championships held in Tallinn. In 2019, he competed in the men's marathon at the 2019 World Athletics Championships held in Doha, Qatar. He finished in 12th place.

Competition record

National titles
 Italian Athletics Championships
 5000 m: 2016
 Half marathon: 2017
 Italian 10 km road Championship
 10 km road race: 2017

Personal bests
Marathon: 2:08:05,  London Marathon, 28 April 2019

See also
 Italian all-time lists - Marathon
 Naturalized athletes of Italy

References

External links
 

1993 births
Living people
Sportspeople from Casablanca
Italian male marathon runners
Italian male long-distance runners
Moroccan male marathon runners
Moroccan male long-distance runners
Italian Athletics Championships winners
Moroccan emigrants to Italy
Naturalised citizens of Italy
Italian sportspeople of African descent
Athletes (track and field) at the 2020 Summer Olympics
Olympic athletes of Italy